Raphaela Folie (born 7 March 1991) is an Italian professional volleyball player who plays for VeroVolley Monza and for national team.

Career
Folie played with her national team at the 2014 World Championship. There her team ended up in fourth place after losing 2–3 to Brazil the bronze medal match.

Awards

Clubs
 2012 Italian Supercup —  Runner-Up, with Asystel MC Carnaghi
 2013 Italian Cup —  Runner-Up, with Asystel MC Carnaghi
 2014 Italian Cup —  Runner-Up, with Volley Bergamo
 2016 Italian Supercup -  Champions, with Imoco Volley Conegliano
 2016-17 Italian Cup (Coppa Italia) -  Champions, with Imoco Volley Conegliano
 2016–17 CEV Champions League -  Runner-Up, with Imoco Volley Conegliano
 2017–18 Italian League -  Champion, with Imoco Volley Conegliano
 2018 Italian Supercup -  Champions, with Imoco Volley Conegliano
 2018–19 Italian League -  Champion, with Imoco Volley Conegliano
 2018–19 CEV Champions League -  Runner-Up, with Imoco Volley Conegliano
 2019 Italian Supercup -  Champions, with Imoco Volley Conegliano
 2019 FIVB Volleyball Women's Club World Championship -  Champion, with Imoco Volley Conegliano
 2019-20 Italian Cup (Coppa Italia) -  Champion, with Imoco Volley Conegliano
 2020 Italian Supercup -  Champions, with Imoco Volley Conegliano
 2020-21 Italian Cup (Coppa Italia) -  Champion, with Imoco Volley Conegliano
 2020–21 Italian League -  Champion, with Imoco Volley Conegliano
 2020–21 CEV Women's Champions League -  Champion, with Imoco Volley Conegliano
 2021 Italian Supercup -  Champions, with Imoco Volley Conegliano
 2021-22 Italian Cup (Coppa Italia) -  Champion, with Imoco Volley Conegliano
 2021–22 Italian League -  Champion, with Imoco Volley Conegliano

Individuals
 2020 Italian Supercup "Most Valuable Player"

References

1991 births
Italian women's volleyball players
Living people
Sportspeople from Bolzano
Competitors at the 2013 Mediterranean Games
Mediterranean Games gold medalists for Italy
Mediterranean Games medalists in volleyball
Volleyball players at the 2020 Summer Olympics
Olympic volleyball players of Italy
21st-century Italian women